David McLean Fraser (born 6 June 1937) is a Scottish former professional footballer who played in the Football League for Hull City and Mansfield Town.

References

1937 births
Living people
Scottish footballers
Sportspeople from Midlothian
Association football forwards
English Football League players
Arniston Rangers F.C. players
Hull City A.F.C. players
Mansfield Town F.C. players
Third Lanark A.C. players
Cowdenbeath F.C. players
Scottish Football League players
Scottish Junior Football Association players